Marjorie Raistrick-Carter (born 10 May 1934) is a British gymnast. She competed at the 1952 Summer Olympics and the 1960 Summer Olympics.

References

1934 births
Living people
British female artistic gymnasts
Olympic gymnasts of Great Britain
Gymnasts at the 1952 Summer Olympics
Gymnasts at the 1960 Summer Olympics
Sportspeople from Bradford